Antigonë is a former municipality in the Gjirokastër County, southern Albania. At the 2015 local government reform it became a subdivision of the municipality Gjirokastër. The population at the 2011 census was 998. The municipal unit is known for the ancient city of Antigonia (Chaonia). The municipal unit consists of the villages Asim Zeneli, Arshi Lengo, Krinë, Tranoshisht and Saraqinisht.

References

Former municipalities in Gjirokastër County
Administrative units of Gjirokastër